Flood is a Canadian animated short film, directed by Amanda Strong and released in 2017. The film tells the story of Thunder, an indigenous youth created by the Spider Woman to combat the flood of lies and threats to indigenous peoples spawned by European colonization of North America.

The film premiered on October 1, 2017 at the 2017 Vancouver International Film Festival.

It was subsequently named to TIFF's year-end Canada's Top Ten list for short films in 2017, and was selected by journalist Jesse Wente for a CBC program of five short films on the theme of "Keep Calm and Decolonize".

References

External links

2017 films
2017 short films
2010s animated short films
2010s English-language films
English-language Canadian films
Canadian animated short films
First Nations films
2010s Canadian films